Ho Cheng Yau (1933–2016) was a Hong Kong former professional footballer. He represented Hong Kong in 1950s to 1960s. Ho represented Hong Kong in 1954 and 1958 Asian Games.

Ho also represented Hong Kong Chinese in a non-FIFA recognized match against Malayan Chinese in Ho Ho Cup. The team also consisted of Ho's South China team-mate Yiu Chuk Yin and Mok Chun Wa, both Hong Kong-born Chinese footballers who represented Republic of China (Taiwan). Ho also played in 1961 Merdeka Tournament.

Ho, Mok and Yiu were collectively known as the Three Aces of South China.

References

1933 births
2016 deaths
Hong Kong footballers
Hong Kong international footballers
Hong Kong First Division League players
1956 AFC Asian Cup players
1964 AFC Asian Cup players
1968 AFC Asian Cup players
Association footballers not categorized by position